Felix Weber may refer to:
Felix Weber (songwriter) (born 1960), German songwriter and producer
Felix Weber (footballer) (born 1995), German footballer
Felix Weber (artist) (born 1965), multi-disciplinary artist
Felix Weber (runner), long-distance runner and champion at the 2019 German Athletics Championships